Estakhruiyeh (also Romanized as Estakhrū’īyeh; also known as Esţarkhū’īyeh) is a village in Dehsard Rural District, in the Central District of Arzuiyeh County, Kerman Province, Iran. At the 2006 census, its population was 74, in 27 families.

References 

Populated places in Arzuiyeh County